Spasovo may refer to the following places in Bulgaria:

Spasovo, Dobrich Province
Spasovo, Stara Zagora Province